Blanche Fury is a 1939 mystery thriller novel by the British writer Marjorie Bowen, published under the pen name of Joseph Shearing. It was republished as a Armed Services Edition during the Second World War.

Film adaptation
In 1948 it was adapted into a British film of the same title directed by Marc Allégret and starring Valerie Hobson and Stewart Granger.

References

Bibliography
 Goble, Alan. The Complete Index to Literary Sources in Film. Walter de Gruyter, 1999.
 Vinson, James. Twentieth-Century Romance and Gothic Writers. Macmillan, 1982.

1939 British novels
Novels set in England
British novels adapted into films
British mystery novels
British thriller novels
Novels by Marjorie Bowen
Novels set in the 19th century
Heinemann (publisher) books